Disney Junior is an American pay television network owned by the Disney  Entertainment unit of The Walt Disney Company through Disney Branded Television. Aimed mainly at children two to seven years old, its programming consists of original first-run television series, films, and select other third-party programming.

As of January 2016, the channel is available to 74 million households in the U.S.

History

Origins

The Walt Disney Company first attempted to launch a 24-hour subscription channel for preschoolers in the United States, when the company announced plans to launch Playhouse Disney, a television offshoot of Disney Channel's daytime programming block of the same name, which launched on the channel on May 8, 1997 (airing during the morning hours seven days a week, with the weekday blocks lasting until the early afternoon). Plans for the United States network were ultimately shelved. However, channels using the Playhouse Disney moniker were launched in other countries internationally.

The development of Disney Junior began on May 26, 2010, when Disney-ABC Television Group announced the launch of the channel as a pay television service, which would compete with other subscription channels targeted primarily at preschool-aged children in addition to the Playhouse Disney branded blocks and channels being rebranded under Disney Junior.

The flagship channel in the United States intended to replace Soapnet, a Disney-owned channel featuring daytime soap operas seen on the major broadcast networks (including sister network ABC) and reruns of former primetime drama series, due to the continued decline in popularity and quantity of soap operas on broadcast television, along with the growth of video on demand services (including the online streaming availability for soap operas) and digital video recorders that negated the need for a linear channel devoted to the genre.

Network and block launches
Disney Junior first launched as a programming block on Disney Channel on February 14, 2011. The Disney Junior channel was originally scheduled to launch in January 2012, but on July 28, 2011, the Disney-ABC Television Group pushed back the channel's launch date to an unspecified date in early 2012, then on January 9, 2012, the Disney-ABC Television Group announced that Soapnet's closing date for most cable providers was scheduled for March 22, 2012. Disney Junior's 24-hour subscription channel counterpart officially launched the following day on March 23, at 12:00 a.m. Eastern Time with the Mickey Mouse Clubhouse episode "Mickey's Big Surprise" as the first program to air on the channel. Programming featured on the channel's initial lineup included Jake and the Never Land Pirates, Mickey Mouse Clubhouse and freshman original series Doc McStuffins; the channel also had new episodes of the short-form series A Poem Is. as well as the weekend movie block, the Magical World of Disney Junior.

Though it in effect took over the channel space held by Soapnet, an automated feed of that channel continued to exist for providers that had not yet reached agreements to carry Disney Junior, or held out to not lose subscribers due to the immediate loss of that network. These included some providers such as Cox Communications, Optimum, DirecTV, Verizon FiOS, and Time Warner Cable, which continued to carry Soapnet while having added the Disney Junior channel onto their channel lineups in turn. Soapnet's operations continued sixteen months later than had been originally planned, until the network finally ceased operations on December 31, 2013, at 11:59 p.m. Eastern Time.

In 2012, Disney Junior launched a movie night anthology as the Magical World of Disney Junior. The channel also premiered its first Disney Junior Original Movie, Lucky Duck during Magical World on Friday, June 20, 2014. The morning block of Disney Junior programming on Disney Channel itself is currently known as Mickey Mornings.

Television carriage 
Since its launch, Disney Junior became initially available to subscribers of Xfinity, Time Warner Cable, Cablevision, Bright House Networks, and Verizon FiOS; other providers would sign carriage agreements to run the network following its launch:
 On March 26, 2012, Cox Communications announced that it would carry Disney Junior, as part of the provider's "Variety Pak" package.
 On April 3, 2012, Disney–ABC Television Group announced that it had reached a distribution agreement with the National Cable Television Cooperative to carry Disney Junior, which negotiates carriage deals on behalf of many of America's smaller cable providers.
 Cable One added the network to the digital tier of its systems around May 26, 2012.
 On June 21, 2012, RCN began carrying the network on its systems.
 On July 13, 2012, DirecTV announced that the Disney Junior network would be added to its lineup the following day on the 14th, a Saturday. Industry observers questioned both the unexpected announcement and untraditional weekend launch of the network as being timed to a nine-day carriage dispute between DirecTV and Viacom and the loss of Nick Jr. four days previously as a result of the dispute.
 On December 31, 2012, Charter Communications came to terms with Disney–ABC Television Group on a new wide-ranging multiple-year carriage agreement for ABC, all of the U.S.-based Disney Channels Worldwide and ESPN networks and ABC Family, which included the addition of Disney Junior to Charter systems throughout the first quarter of 2013.
 On January 15, 2013, AT&T U-verse also reached a deal with The Walt Disney Company on a new wide-ranging multi-year agreement to carry the Disney–ABC Television Group family of networks and ESPN, which included the addition of Disney Junior.
 Dish Network, the last major television provider to have not signed a carriage deal for Disney Junior, added the channel on April 10, 2014; after a long period of acrimony and a six-month extension of their past carriage agreement with The Walt Disney Company for a few select networks (some of which were not available in HD, partly as a result of a 2011 dispute with the company), Dish and Disney came to full terms on carrying all of Disney-ABC's networks in both standard and high definition on March 3, 2014, with the resolution of legal issues involving Dish's Hopper DVR system, which also included streaming rights for the networks as part of Dish's IPTV streaming service Sling TV.

Programming

Programming on the Disney Junior channel includes original series (such as Alice's Wonderland Bakery), shows formerly seen on the now-defunct Playhouse Disney block (such as Mickey Mouse Clubhouse), plus re-runs of former original shows (such as Doc McStuffins) - including some that also air on the companion Disney Channel morning block and short-form series, as well as reruns of some older animated series that had previously been seen on sister network ABC, CBS (made before 1996) and programs from Disney Channel and Toon Disney, which are aired by the channel by popular demand (especially during the overnight graveyard slot). The network also carries some programs produced outside of Disney, including PJ Masks, Babar and the Adventures of Badou, and Bluey.

Disney Junior Night Light (block) 
Disney Junior Night Light is the former name of Disney Junior channel's overnight programming block, running daily from 9:00 p.m. to 4:00 a.m. Eastern and Pacific. The block, which debuted on September 4, 2012, was sponsored by the Disney-owned parenting site Babble, consisting of short-form programs intended for co-viewing among parents and their children. Features seen as part of the block included Picture This (a drawing segment), Sesh Tales (a segment featuring costumed finger puppets with twists on traditional fairy tales) and That's Fresh (a segment featuring cooking tips aimed at parents, presented by celebrity chef Helen Cavallo). Additional series under development at the block's launch included a photography series, a series that follows parents through the day their new baby comes home after being born, and a show about stay-at-home dads. Since 2017, Disney Junior's overnight programming has run unbranded and without the Night Light continuity.

Related services

International

Disney Junior, formerly known as Playhouse Disney, is available around the world. Since 2020, many of these networks were closed in favor of direct customer promotion of Disney+, where Disney Junior's content was moved to.

References

External links

 
 Disney Junior Press 

 
2012 establishments in California
Preschool education television networks
Children's television networks in the United States
Disney Channel
Disney television networks
Commercial-free television networks
Television programming blocks
Television programming blocks in the United States
Television channels and stations established in 2012
English-language television stations in the United States